Thornton Rust is a village and civil parish in the Richmondshire district of North Yorkshire, England.

History

The village is mentioned in the Domesday Book of 1086 by the name Toreton. At the time of the Norman invasion the manor belonged to Thor, but afterwards was granted to Count Alan of Brittany.  A mesne lordship was held here by Sybil of Thornton in 1286, but the head tenant of the manor was Robert de Tateshall, who was also lord of Thorlaby manor. The descent of Thornton Rust manor followed that of Thoralby into the 19th century.

The toponymy of the village name is derived from the combination of the Old English words of þorn and tūn, which gave the meaning of Thorn tree farm, and partly it is said from Bishop Restitutus, to whom the medieval chapel was claimed to have been dedicated, though evidence is lacking. The chapel no longer exists.

Governance

The village lies within the Richmond UK Parliament constituency. It also lies within the Upper Dales electoral division of North Yorkshire County Council and the Addlebrough ward of Richmondshire District Council.

The civil parish shares a grouped parish council with the civil parishes of Aysgarth, Bishopdale, Newbiggin and Thoralby, known as Aysgarth & District Parish Council.

Geography

It is a typical linear village on top of a limestone scar.

Demography

2001 census

The 2001 UK census showed that the population was split 50% male to 50% female. The religious constituency was made of 78.4% Christian and the rest stating no religion or not stating at all. The ethnic make-up was 97.7% White British and 2.3% White other. There were 57 dwellings.

2011 census

The 2011 UK census showed that the population was split 51.4% male to 48.6% female. The religious constituency was made of 78.5% Christian and the rest stating no religion or not stating at all. The ethnic make-up was 98.1% White British and 1.9% each White Other. There were 63 dwellings.

Community and culture

The village has a bus service which is operated by the Little White Bus and goes between Hawes and Leyburn. More Services can be reached from the nearby villages of Aysgarth and Worton.

References

External links

Villages in North Yorkshire
Civil parishes in North Yorkshire
Wensleydale